François Béchard (April 18, 1830 – April 13, 1897) was a Quebec farmer and political figure. He represented Iberville and then St. Johns—Iberville in the House of Commons of Canada as a Liberal member from 1867 to 1896. He was a member of the Senate of Canada for De Lorimier division from 1896 to 1897.

He was born in Mount Johnson (now Mont-Saint-Grégoire), Lower Canada in 1830, the son of François Béchard and Clémence Gozette, and educated at the College of Saint-Hyacinthe. He served as a major in the local militia and was mayor of Saint-Grégoire. Béchard was named to the Senate in September 1896 and died in 1897 in Montreal while still in office.

References 

1830 births
1897 deaths
Canadian senators from Quebec
Liberal Party of Canada MPs
Liberal Party of Canada senators
Members of the House of Commons of Canada from Quebec
Mayors of places in Quebec